Shemen is the most commonly used word for oil in the Hebrew scriptures, used around 170 times in a variety of contexts.

Cooking oil
In  describing the ordination of Aaron and his sons, unleavened challah made with oil, translated as 'cakes', and wafers spread with oil are among the required offerings. The cakes, wafers and bread offering made of the best quality of wheat are placed in a basket. After Aaron and his sons are anointed with oil and blood, the ram's tail fat, kidneys and other parts are burned as an offering, along with one oil cake, one wafer, and a piece of the unleavened bread. Then the remaining ram flesh is boiled for Aaron and his sons to eat along with the remainder of the bread and cakes.

Excavations at Tel Miqne-Ekron that reveal over a hundred oil presses the region seems to have been central to a major olive oil industry.

 describes the wealth of the lands of Asher: "From Asher shall come fat bread [rich foods], and he will provide delicacies of a king". The relationship between fat and oil has been discussed by Ibn Ezra. The blessings of Asher's exceptionally fertile lands is given by Moses in : "May he dip his foot in oil".

Describing the hardships of the in the wilderness, in  the Israelites have only manna to eat, which they prepare into flat cakes called  that according to the passage tasted like . Translated as rich cream by the JPS, the certain meaning is not known.

Ritual uses

In  two unblemished rams are brought before Aaron and his sons for their ordination as priests. One is sacrificed as a burnt offering, while the second is slaughtered and some of the blood mixed with anointing oil and sprinkled on the priestly vestments. It was also used to anoint kings.

It is used for anointing oil in conjunction with Bethel and other sites that were "anointed" in the narrative of Jacob's Ladder and subsequent second visit to Bethel. It is also used in the context of offerings in : "Will the Lord be pleased with thousands of rams, With ten thousands of rivers of oil? Shall I give my first born for my transgression, The fruit of my body for the sin of my soul?"

 discusses Israel's obligations to provide the daily oil for the lamps at the Tabernacle, and the weekly bread for the priests.

There are various additional rules on the use of oil for lighting in different contexts such as searching for chametz during Pesach. Sometimes the shamash candle is made of wax, while olive oil is used for the other candles.

Trade
According to  oil is exchanged with Tyre: "Judah, and the land of Israel, they were thy merchants: they traded in thy market wheat of Minnith, and Pannag, and honey, and oil, and balm."  discusses the context of relations between Ephraim and Egypt: "Ephraim feedeth on wind, and followeth after the east wind: he daily increaseth lies and desolation; and they do make a covenant with the Assyrians, and oil is carried into Egypt".

Perfume or cosmetic oil
There are several biblical references to non-ritual cosmetic use.

References

Language of the Hebrew Bible
Oils